Kim Yevhenovych Fomin (real name Akim Feofanovych Fomin; born in 1914 in Balta, Podolian Governorate – died in 1976 in Odessa) was a Soviet Ukrainian football player and coach. He is mentioned in a book of Oleh Makarov "Vratar" (1963).

Life
Born in Balta, the Fomini family moved to Odessa before the Bolshevik coup. In Odessa, Fomin lived near the Kulykove Pole (English: Wader's Field) which was a center of the Odessa city football in the early 20th century.

After the Soviet occupation of Ukraine in 1920s, he was forced to change his name Akim Feofanovych to Kim Yevhenovych.

Football career

Until 1937 he played for the Odessa's local teams including FC Dynamo Odessa finishing his career in FC Traktor Kharkiv that year.

After the World War II in 1945, Fomin became a head coach of the revived Pishchevik Odessa and with some breaks stayed with the club until 1955. After the club's relegation and its liquidation in 1950, in the 1951 Football Championship of Ukraine started out two teams from Odessa, Spartak and Metalurh and Kim Fomin was appointed a head coach of Metalurh. When in 1953 Metalurh was admitted to the Soviet Class B (later Soviet First League) competitions, Fomin was replaced by a Muscovite coach Aleksei Kostylev. Fomin continued to coach a local football school in Odessa. He returned as a head coach of Pishchevik however couple of years later due to the poor performance of the club under Kostylev's leadership. In 1955 Metalurh was reorganized and in its place was reestablished Pishchevik, while couple of years later Metalurh Odessa restarted again in the Football Championship of Ukraine. During the mid season Fomin was replaced again with an Armenian specialist.

After Pishchevik, Fomin coached another Odessa club SKA Odessa and later Avanhard Zhovti Vody.

Notes

Further reading
 Makarov, O. Vratar (Goalie). "Radyanskyi pysmenyk". Kiev, 1963.

References

External links
 SC Odessa. Odessa Football.
 Akim Fomin. Odessa Football.
 

1914 births
1976 deaths
People from Balta, Ukraine
People from Baltsky Uyezd
Soviet footballers
Ukrainian footballers
Soviet football managers
Ukrainian football managers
FC Dynamo Odesa players
FC Chornomorets Odesa managers
SC Odesa managers
FC Sirius Kryvyi Rih managers
Association footballers not categorized by position
Sportspeople from Odesa Oblast